The Oklahoma Secretary of Health and Human Services is a member of the Oklahoma Governor's Cabinet. The Secretary is appointed by the Governor, with the consent of the Oklahoma Senate, to serve at the pleasure of the Governor. The Secretary serves as the chief advisor to the Governor on public health and public assistance.

History
The position of Secretary of Health and Human Services was established in 1986 by the Executive Branch Reform Act of 1986. The Act directed to the Secretary to oversee all agencies in the State relating to the public health and assistance programs. The position was dissolved on February 1, 2003, by Governor Brad Henry when he split the post into two separate positions: the Oklahoma Secretary of Health concerned with public health protection and the Oklahoma Secretary of Human Services concerned with providing public assistance programs.

The position was re-established by Governor Mary Fallin on January 27, 2011, when she dissolved the separate positions of Health Secretary and Human Services Secretary.

Responsibilities
The Secretary of Health and Human Services is the chief public health officer of the State. The Secretary oversees vaccinations, disease prevention, mental health services, substance abuse treatment, and emergency health responses. The Secretary also is responsible for regulation of the State health delivery system as well as overseeing the State's Medicaid program. The Secretary has jurisdiction over most public assistance programs offered by the State. Such programs include child care services, senior citizen assistance, child custody services, disability vocational services, and services to the blind and deaf. The Secretary also oversees services to juveniles, both treatment and corrections.

As of fiscal year 2011, the Secretary of Health oversees 15,591 full-time employees and is responsible for an annual budget over $8 billion.

Agencies overseen
The Secretary of Health and Human Services oversees the following State agencies:

All numbers represented Fiscal Year 2011 levels

List of Secretaries
An incomplete list of Secretaries:

Secretaries of Health and Human Services (1986–2003)

Secretary of Health (2003–2011)

Secretary of Human Services (2003–2011)

Secretaries of Health and Human Services (2011–2019)

Secretaries of Health and Human Services (2019–Present)

References

External links

Health and Human Services
Health and Human Services